Babadağ, formerly Kadıköy, is a highland town and district of Denizli Province in the Aegean region of Turkey, reached by a steep, winding road uphill from the town of Sarayköy. It was known in antiquity as Salbacos.

Agriculture is hard on this mountainside and thus the people have been making a living from stitching clothing in Babadağ for a long time, and others have migrated to Denizli, İzmir and Istanbul. Thus this is the hometown of many of Denizli's successful traders and textile entrepreneurs. Babadağ dollar is Denizli slang for the expression my word is my bond. There are still active workshops in the town, which is also a popular mountain summer holiday location.

The area is characterized by the existence of geological fault zones, which have contributed in the past to the occurrence of many landslides. There was also a high risk of landslides in town, which led the government to evacuate Gündoğdu, a steeply sloped urban district of Babadağ, in 2006. The homes of about 2000 persons were destroyed to prevent uncontrolled return of their former inhabitants, many of whom relocated to newly built houses in the provincial capital Denizli.

In 2019, a large wind park was built on the mountain crest southwest of Babadağ. The towers are visible from many locations in town. The wind park runs along the border between the provinces Denizli und Aydın and is known as Denizli Wind Power Plant. It consists of 22 wind turbines with a total installed power of 74.8 MW. The project was co-financed by the European Bank for Reconstruction and Development. The plant was built by Siemens Gamesa and went on the power grid in 2019/2020. It is operated by the Turkish company Akfen Renewable Energy as part of Akfen Holding.

Notable natives
 Hacı Mehmet Zorlu (1919 in Babadağ, Denizli – 7. Mai 2005 in Istanbul), originally a weaver, later founder of a company dealing in textiles, from which the conglomerate Zorlu Holding developed, one of the largest industry enterprises in Turkey.
 Ahmet Nazif Zorlu (* 1944), son of Mehmet Zorlu, in 2021 Chairman of the Board of Zorlu Holding.
 Zeki Zorlu (* 1939), son of Mehmet Zorlu, in 2021 Vice Chairman of Zorlu Holding.

Photographs

Neighbourhoods

 Ahıllı
 Bekirler
 Demirli
 Kelleci 
 Kıranyer
 Mollaaahmetler
 Oğuzlar
 Yeniköy
 İncirpınar

References

 

Populated places in Denizli Province
Districts of Denizli Province